Voroshilovskoye is a rural locality (a village) in Kaltovsky Selsoviet, Iglinsky District, Bashkortostan, Russia. The population was 32 as of 2010. There is 1 street.

Geography 
Voroshilovskoye is located 30 km southeast of Iglino (the district's administrative centre) by road. Kaltovka is the nearest rural locality.

References 

Rural localities in Iglinsky District